Out of the Blue is a 1947 American screwball comedy film based on the short story by Vera Caspary who also co-wrote the screenplay.  It stars George Brent, Virginia Mayo, Turhan Bey, Ann Dvorak and Carole Landis. It was directed by Leigh Jason.

Plot
Arthur Earthleigh (George Brent) lives in an apartment in Greenwich Village where he is dominated by his wife Mae (Carole Landis) and annoyed by Rabelais, the German Shepherd owned by his neighbour, artist and swinging bachelor David (Turhan Bey).  David has a constant parade of attractive women visiting his apartment to pose for him. He currently is being visited by Deborah (Virginia Mayo) who wants David's champion Rabelais to breed with her dog.

When his wife goes off to visit her sister, Arthur visits a bar where he's picked up by interior decorator Olive (Ann Dvorak) who comes home with him.  Olive has a taste for brandy that she insists alleviates her heart condition but makes her tipsy.  Arthur orders the reluctant Olive to leave, but Olive enters the guest room unbeknownst to Arthur.  Waking up the next day Arthur discovers Olive has not only spent the night but redecorated the room.  In attempting to get her to leave he knocks Olive down to the floor where he thinks she has died.

The film has Olive's 'body' moved about by David who uses Arthur's fear of having killed Olive to blackmail him into changing his mind about having a court order ordering David to get rid of his dog.  Meanwhile, a serial killer is stalking the Village with two elderly snoopers (Elizabeth Patterson and Julia Dean) believing Olive is his victim.  Adding to Arthur's troubles is his wife returning.

Cast
 George Brent as Arthur Earthleigh
 Virginia Mayo as Deborah Tyler
 Turhan Bey as David Gelleo
 Ann Dvorak as Olive Jensen
 Carole Landis as Mae Earthleigh
 Elizabeth Patterson as Miss Spring
 Julia Dean as Miss Ritchie
 Richard Lane as Detective Noonan
 Charles Smith as Elevator Boy (as Charlie Smith)
 Paul Harvey as Holliston
 Alton E. Horton as Detective Dombry
 Hadda Brooks as Singer
 Flame as Rabelais

Production
Mystery writer Vera Caspary's had a percentage deal with Eagle-Lion Films. She also wrote the screenplay for her Bedelia in England the previous year which was also produced by her future husband Isadore Goldsmith.  Her original short story for Out of the Blue appeared in Today's Woman magazine in September 1947.  
Hadda Brooks sings the title song in a nightclub.

References

External links
 

1947 films
American black-and-white films
American comedy films
Eagle-Lion Films films
Films set in New York City
1947 comedy films
Films directed by Leigh Jason
Films scored by Carmen Dragon
Films based on works by Vera Caspary
1940s English-language films
1940s American films